Iranians in the United Kingdom consist of people of Iranian nationality who have settled in the United Kingdom, as well as British residents and citizens of Iranian heritage. Iranians in the United Kingdom are referred to by hyphenated terms such as British-Iranians, British-Persians, Iranian-Britons, or Persian-Britons. At the time of the 2011 census, 84,735 Iranian-born people resided in the UK. In 2017, the Office for National Statistics estimated the Iranian-born population to be 70,000.

Terminology 
British-Iranian is used interchangeably with British-Persian, partly due to the fact that, in the Western world, Iran was known as "Persia". On the Nowruz of 1935, Reza Shah Pahlavi asked foreign delegates to use the term Iran, the endonym of the country used since the Sasanian Empire, in formal correspondence. Since then the use of the word "Iran" has become more common in the Western countries. This also changed the usage of the terms for Iranian nationality, and the common adjective for citizens of Iran changed from "Persian" to "Iranian". In 1959, the government of Mohammad Reza Pahlavi, Reza Shah's son, announced that both "Persia" and "Iran" could officially be used interchangeably. However the issue is still debated today. 

There is a tendency among British-Iranians to categorize themselves as "Persian" rather than "Iranian", mainly to dissociate themselves from the Islamic regime of Iran which has been in power since the 1979 revolution and the negativity associated with it, and also to distinguish themselves as being of Persian ethnicity, which comprise about 65% of Iran's population. While the majority of British-Iranians come from Persian backgrounds, there is a significant number of non-Persian Iranians such as Azerbaijanis and Kurds within the British-Iranian community, leading some scholars to believe that the label "Iranian" is more inclusive, since the label "Persian" excludes non-Persian minorities.  The Collins English Dictionary uses a variety of similar and overlapping definitions for the terms "Persian" and "Iranian".

History
The vast majority of Iranians in the UK arrived after the Iranian Revolution of 1979. In the following five years, an estimated 8,000 Iranian asylum seekers arrived in the country. The 1981 census showed 28,617 persons born in Iran (18,132 men, 10,485 women). Iranians were not separately distinguished in the 1991 census. The 2001 census recorded 42,494 persons born in Iran. In the 2011 census, 79,985 Iranian-born people were recorded in England, 1,695 in Wales, 2,773 in Scotland and 282 in Northern Ireland. The Office for National Statistics estimates that, in 2017, 70,000 Iranian-born people were living in the UK. In 2004, the Iranian embassy in London estimated that as many as 75,000 Iranians might reside in the country. Most adults are themselves immigrants; the second generation are quite young, and so there are relatively few adults of Iranian background born and raised in the UK.

Religion
Iran is a primarily Shia Muslim country with Jewish, Baháʼí, Christian and Zoroastrian communities, a fact reflected in the migrant population in the UK. However, there is an increasing number of Iranian Atheists and Agnostics. Some Iranians in the UK have converted from Shi'ism to various sects of Christianity. There are also active Jewish and Christian communities among British Iranians.

See also
 List of British Iranians
 Iranian diaspora
 Iran–United Kingdom relations

References

Notes

Sources

Further reading

External links
The Flight from Tehran: British-Iranians 30 Years On, a series of radio programmes from the BBC
Iranian Association, Iranian Association was established as a registered charity in 1985 providing information and advice. It is also involved with art and culture, working with the British and Victoria & Albert museums to improve Iranian participation in London’s cultural life.
Iran Heritage Foundation, A non-political charity promoting the history and culture of Iran. It organises everything from lectures and talks to poetry recitals.
Kayhan London, Kayhan London is a publication for Iranian expats in London and beyond.

 
Immigration to the United Kingdom by country of origin
Islam in the United Kingdom
Muslim communities in Europe
United Kingdom
British Iranian